"My Drink n My 2 Step" is a song by American hip hop recording artist Cassidy, released as the lead single from his third studio album B.A.R.S. The Barry Adrian Reese Story (2007). The song features vocals and production from longtime collaborator Swizz Beatz. The song peaked at #33 on the Billboard Hot 100, making it his final song there.

Background
The song is Cassidy's first single after his hiatus from music following a car accident and amnesia. The song samples Doug E. Fresh's "Nuthin'". Both Cassidy and Swizz Beatz use the Auto-Tune effect. The song was officially remixed featuring new verses from American recording artists, Kanye West and Ne-Yo.

Music video
The music video premiered on Rap City, on September 10, 2007; it features a cameo appearance from American singer Mario.

Track listing

Vinyl
 "My Drink n My 2 Step" (feat. Swizz Beatz - radio mix) 
 "My Drink n My 2 Step" (feat. Swizz Beatz - instrumental) 
 "My Drink n My 2 Step" (feat. Swizz Beatz - club mix) 
 "My Drink n My 2 Step" (feat. Swizz Beatz - a cappella)

Remixes
 "My Drink n My 2 Step" (feat. Chingy & Swizz Beatz)
 "My Drink n My 2 Step" (Official Remix feat. Swizz Beatz, Kanye West & Ne-Yo)
 "Kicks n My New Dress" (feat. Nina Sky & Swizz Beatz)
 "My Drink n My 2 Step" (feat. Chingy, Swizz Beatz & Jermaine Dupri)
 "My Drink n My 2 Step" (feat. Jermaine Dupri & Swizz Beatz)
 "My Pepsi n My 2 Step" (feat. Shiz Lansky & Swizz Beatz)

Charts

Weekly charts

Year-end charts

References

External links
Cassidy at MySpace

[]

2007 singles
2007 songs
Cassidy (rapper) songs
Swizz Beatz songs
Song recordings produced by Swizz Beatz
Songs written by Swizz Beatz